Methylobacillus rhizosphaerae is a Gram-negative,  methylotrophic, strictly aerobic and motile bacterium from the genus of Methylobacillus which has been isolated from rhizospheric soil from a field with red pepper in India.

References

 

Bacteria described in 2016
Methylophilaceae